Lhohi (Dhivehi: ޅޮހި) is one of the islands of Noonu Atoll in the Maldives with a population of around 900 people.

History
On Lhohi, there is a place called "hanguraama fasgandu" where the Portuguese and Maldivians fought.

Geography
Lhohi is located near Manadhoo, the capital of Noonu atoll. Manadhoo, Miladhoo and Magoodhoo are the nearest populated islands. The nearest island is a small island called Ganbilivaadhoo.

Demography

References

Islands of the Maldives